Fingland is a hamlet in the Allerdale district, in the county of Cumbria, England. Fingland is located on the B5307 road in between the villages of Kirkbride and Kirkbampton. In 1870-72 the township had a population of 219. There is a farm called Fingland Rigg nearby, which gives its name to Finglandrigg Woods National Nature Reserve.

It was called Thingland in the Middle Ages (Thingland in 1279) meaning "place of the a Scandinavian ting, assembly". There is a similar place-name in Normandy near Jobourg (Cotentin) : le Tingland.

See also

Listed buildings in Bowness

References 

Hamlets in Cumbria
Allerdale